A Maryland Enterprise Zone (MEZ) is a specially zoned commercial area in the state of Maryland where businesses are eligible for income tax credits and real property tax credits in return for job creation and investments made in the zone.

External links
Maryland Enterprise Zone Tax Credits

See also
 Urban Enterprise Zone

Taxation in Maryland